The American Electrology Association is the largest professional membership organization for practitioners of electrolysis permanent hair removal.  Although its name says American, its membership is actually international.

Certifications
Together with Educational Testing Service they created and administer the Certified Professional Electrologist exam. Those passing the exam are known as Board Certified Electrologists,  Certified Professional Electrologists (CPE).

External links

Official Website
Hair Removal Wax
Laser Hair Removal

Hair removal
Organizations established in 1958
Professional associations based in the United States
1958 establishments in the United States